Mach O, mach 0, Mach Zero, or, variant, may refer to:

 Mach-O, the Mach object executable file format
 Mach-O Acres Airport (FAA id: 98OR), Sheridan, Yamhill County, Oregon, USA
 Mach 0, a mach number
 M.A.C.H. Zero (IPC Media), fictional character from the comic book 2000 AD

See also

 Mach (disambiguation)
 Macho (disambiguation)